Mats Wilander was the defending champion, but did not compete this year.

Guillermo Pérez Roldán won the title by defeating Paolo Canè 6–1, 6–4 in the final.

Seeds

Draw

Finals

Top half

Bottom half

References

External links
 Official results archive (ATP)
 Official results archive (ITF)

Campionati Internazionali di Sicilia
1989 Grand Prix (tennis)
Camp